Polača is a village in Croatia, in the municipality of Knin, Šibenik-Knin County.

Demographics
According to the 2011 census, the village of Polača has 210 inhabitants. This represents 13.24% of its pre-war population according to the 1991 census.

The 1991 census recorded that 99.43% of the village population were ethnic Serbs (1577/1586), 0.32% were ethnic Croats (5/1586) and 0.25% were of other ethnic origin (4/1586).

References

Populated places in Šibenik-Knin County
Knin
Serb communities in Croatia